In molecular biology mir-671 microRNA is a short RNA molecule. MicroRNAs function to regulate the expression levels of other genes by several mechanisms.

Alcoholic and Non-Alcoholic Fatty Liver Disease
miR-671 expression levels have been found to be vary significantly between the alcoholic and non-alcoholic forms of fatty liver disease.

CDR1 regulation
miR-671 has been seen to negatively regulate the CDR1 (Cerebellar Degeneration-Related protein 1) gene, through the targeting and cleavage of a circular antisense transcript of the CDR1 locus. There is a partnered decrease in CDR1 mRNA levels with this downregulation.

FN1 repression
miR-671 is able to bind to and repress fibronection type 1 (FN1) mRNA at its 3'untranslated region binding site.

See also 
 MicroRNA

References

Further reading

External links
 

MicroRNA
MicroRNA precursor families